Refat Amin is a Bangladesh Awami League politician and the former Member of the Bangladesh Parliament from a reserved seat.

Early life
Amin was born on 21 April 1953 and she has studied up to H.S.C. degree.

Career
Amin was elected to parliament from reserved seat as a Bangladesh Awami League candidate in 2014.

References

Awami League politicians
Living people
1953 births
Women members of the Jatiya Sangsad
10th Jatiya Sangsad members
21st-century Bangladeshi women politicians
21st-century Bangladeshi politicians